Olibrus is a genus of shining flower beetles in the family Phalacridae. There are at least 30 described species in Olibrus.

Species
These 37 species belong to the genus Olibrus:

 Olibrus aenescens Küster, 1852 g
 Olibrus aeneus (Fabricius, 1792) g
 Olibrus affinis (Sturm, 1807) g
 Olibrus baudueri Flach, 1888 g
 Olibrus bicolor (Fabricius, 1792) g
 Olibrus bimaculatus Küster, 1848 g
 Olibrus bisignatus (Ménétriés, 1849) g
 Olibrus brunneus (Motschulsky, 1858) g
 Olibrus bullatus Casey, 1916 b
 Olibrus castaneus Baudi di Selve, 1870 g
 Olibrus caucasicus Tournier, 1889 g
 Olibrus cinerariae Wollaston, 1854 g
 Olibrus congener Wollaston, 1864 g
 Olibrus consanguineus Flach g
 Olibrus corticalis (Panzer, 1797) g
 Olibrus delicatulus Tournier, 1889 g
 Olibrus demarzoi Svec & Angelini, 1996 g
 Olibrus fallax Flach, 1888 g
 Olibrus flavicornis (Sturm, 1807) g
 Olibrus gerhardti Flach, 1888 g
 Olibrus guttatus Tournier, 1889 g
 Olibrus koltzei Flach, 1888 g
 Olibrus liquidus Erichson, 1845 g
 Olibrus millefolii (Paykull, 1800) g
 Olibrus norvegicus Munster, 1901 g
 Olibrus particeps Mulsant & Rey, 1861 g
 Olibrus pygmaeus (Sturm, 1807) g
 Olibrus reitteri Flach, 1888 g
 Olibrus reyi Guillebeau, 1892 g
 Olibrus rufipes LeConte, 1856 g b
 Olibrus seidlitzi Flach, 1888 g
 Olibrus selvei Guillebeau, 1892 g
 Olibrus semistriatus LeConte, 1856 g b
 Olibrus singularis Tournier, 1889 g
 Olibrus stierlini Flach, 1888 g
 Olibrus subaereus Wollaston, 1864 g
 Olibrus vittatus LeConte, 1863 g b

Data sources: i = ITIS, c = Catalogue of Life, g = GBIF, b = Bugguide.net

References

Further reading

External links

 

Phalacridae